The Military-Industrial Commission of the Russian Federation was established by a presidential decree in March 2006. According to the decree, it is a permanently functioning body with vast responsibilities for supervising the distribution and implementation of the "State defense order". The commission answers directly to the President of Russia. It coordinates between the Defence Ministry of the Russian Federation, the Armed Forces of the Russian Federation, and the defense industry of Russia. Until then, the defense industry was supervised by Russia's Ministry of Industry and Energy, as well as by the previous government consultative body with a similar name.

The VPK of the Russian Federation shares the name of the former Soviet Military Industrial Commission, which served as a central management body for the Soviet defense industry. The VPK was an inner circle of the Council of Ministers, and the first deputy chairman of the Council headed it. The Soviet VPK's primary function was to facilitate plan fulfilment by easing bottlenecks, enforcing inter-ministerial cooperation, and overseeing the availability of resources.

Commission members
 Supreme Commander-in-Chief of the Russian Armed Forces (Chairman of the Commission)
 Deputy Prime Minister of Russia (Deputy Chairman of the Commission, Chairman of the Board of the Commission)
 First Deputy Prime Minister of Russia
 First Deputy Secretary of the Security Council of Russia
 Aide to the President
 Minister of Defense of Russia
 Chief of the General Staff
 Deputy Minister of Defense
 Director of the Russian National Guard
 Director of the FSB
 General Director of the State Atomic Energy Corporation Rosatom
 Minister of Internal Affairs of Russia
 Minister of Industry and Trade of Russia
 Minister of Economic Development of Russia
 General Director of Roscosmos
 Director of the Foreign Intelligence Service of Russia
 General Director of Rostec State Corporation

Gunsmith Day
19 September marks Gunsmith Day, the professional holiday for the commission and the forces under its jurisdiction. It was celebrated for the first time in 2010, following a visit in May of that year to the hometown of Mikhail Kalashnikov by Vladimir Putin. 19 September was chosen for this holiday, because the Russian Orthodox Church honors the memory of Saint Michael the Taxiarch on this day.

Journal "Defence of Russia"
The magazine Oborona Rossii or Defence of Russia is the official printed organ of the Military-Industrial Commission and has been published since October 2008. The publication covers the activities of the commission and publishes materials related to the issues and activities of the military-industrial complex of Russia.

Notes

See also
 Military-Industrial Commission of the USSR
 Security Council of Russia
 Federal Service for Defence Contracts (Rosoboronzakaz)

Government of Russia
Defence companies of Russia
Industry in Russia
Military industry
2006 establishments in Russia
Military–industrial complex